Whitmire Creek is a stream tributary to Animas Creek within Hidalgo County, New Mexico. Its source is in Whitmire Canyon in the Peloncillo Mountains in Cochise County, Arizona. It is one of two creeks of that name that are tributary to Animas Creek in the Animas Valley. They both were named for J. B. Whitmire one of the first settlers that established the Whitmire Ranch in the area during the 1880s.

It has its confluence with its tributary Walnut Creek, at the mouth of Whitmire Canyon.

References 

Rivers of Cochise County, Arizona
Rivers of Hidalgo County, New Mexico
Rivers of New Mexico
Rivers of Arizona